The Spey River is a river in the Southland Region of New Zealand. Its entire length lies within the Fiordland National Park. The Spey rises at the Mckenzie Pass and Murrell's Pass either side of Mt Horatio (and the river flows in a northeasterly direction, emptying into the West Arm of Lake Manapouri adjacent to the intake of the Manapouri Power Station.
The Dusky Track follows the Spey valley for much of the river's length.

References

Rivers of Fiordland